Painters Eleven (also known as Painters 11 or P11) was a group of abstract artists active in Canada between 1953 and 1960. They are associated with the Abstract Expressionist movement.

History
Since the 1920s, artists in English Canada had been heavily influenced by the landscape painting of the Group of Seven, and the Canadian Group of Painters. The Canadian public often regarded modernist movements such as Cubism, Surrealism and Abstract Expressionism as bizarre and subversive. The acquisition of modernist paintings, even Impressionist works, by public galleries was invariably a source of controversy. In Quebec, Paul-Émile Borduas and Jean-Paul Riopelle spearheaded the modernist collective known as Les Automatistes, as early as 1941. However, their artistic influence was not quickly felt in English Canada, or indeed much beyond Montreal. In 1953, Toronto artists Oscar Cahén, Walter Yarwood, and Harold Town discussed the possibility of mounting a group show of abstract paintings to strengthen public appreciation of the contemporary art form. A few weeks later, artist William Ronald persuaded the Simpson’s department store in Toronto to display some abstract paintings alongside their modern furniture. During a publicity photo shoot for the Simpson's exhibition, entitled Abstracts at Home, Cahén proposed the group show idea, and a subsequent meeting at Alexandra Luke's cottage in Oshawa led to the formation of Painters Eleven.

Formation
In 1953, eleven abstract painters from Ontario — Jack Bush, Oscar Cahén, Hortense Gordon, Tom Hodgson, Alexandra Luke, Jock Macdonald, Ray Mead, Kazuo Nakamura, William Ronald, Harold Town and Walter Yarwood — dubbed themselves Painters Eleven and held their first exhibition at Roberts Gallery in Toronto in 1954. The exhibition, arranged by Jack Bush, was the first major commercial exhibition of abstract expressionist art in Toronto. Unlike the Group of Seven whose members' work evolved along parallel lines, Painters Eleven did not share a common artistic vision as a group apart from a commitment to abstraction. This was reflected in the diversity of the group's members. Decades separated the youngest from the eldest, and before they sold their paintings they made their living as freelance commercial artists or worked in advertising and as art teachers. Two had studied at summer schools conducted by the American abstract expressionist Hans Hofmann and William Ronald "sat in" on his classes, while others were graduates of the Ontario College of Art, and still others were self-taught. Within the group itself, the artistic center of gravity seems to have been Oscar Cahén, a gifted European émigré who became well known as an illustrator for a number of national magazines. Stylistically speaking, Kazuo Nakamura's abstract works were far more subdued than those of his colleagues, and he also created figurative paintings. 

In Canada's conservative art world, their first exhibition was met with confusion and disdain, typical of new art movements throughout history. By their third exhibition, in 1957, they had established abstract expressionism in Canada. Painters Eleven attained U.S. exposure with a successful exhibition in 1956 with the American Abstract Artists at the Riverside Museum in New York City, and were praised by the influential critic Clement Greenberg on a visit he paid to the group in Toronto in 1957. In the Canadian press, the group's most ardent supporters were art critic Robert Fulford and [art writer] Pearl McCarthy of the Globe and Mail. Eventually, the group's numbers were reduced by death and defection (Cahén was killed in a car accident in 1956, Ronald resigned in 1957) and the group formally disbanded in 1960.

Influence
Painters Eleven are credited with making English Canada's art-buying public more accustomed to abstract expressionist painting. Their influence on the next generation of Canadian artists was immense, and their art is now a prominent feature in public galleries and corporate and private collections throughout Canada and in many international collections. The largest collection of their works can be found at The Robert McLaughlin Gallery in Oshawa, Ontario. Some of the group's members, notably Jack Bush, William Ronald and Harold Town, went on to greater success in the 1960s and 1970s. Jack Bush was given a major exhibition at the Art Gallery of Ontario in 1976, Harold Town in 1986 and Kazuo Nakamura in 2004. Works by the group's members are now fetching higher prices at Canadian fine art auctions. The last surviving member of the group, Tom Hodgson, a former Olympic canoeist and a dedicated abstract expressionist, died in 2006.

Selected group exhibitions
 2010: Museum London, London, Ont.
 2010: Moore Gallery, Toronto, Ont.
 2009: (Painters Eleven exhibition with works in animation) Christopher Cutts Gallery, Toronto
 2007: Thielsen Gallery, London, Ont.
 2003: Thielsen Gallery, London, Ont.
 1999: Drabinsky Gallery, Toronto
 1994 and 1995: Robert McLaughlin Gallery, Oshawa, Ont.
 1984: Cambridge Art Gallery and Library, Cambridge, Ont.
 1979: Rodman Hall, St. Catharines, Ont.
 1978: The Gallery, Stratford, Ont.
 1976: Kitchener-Waterloo Art Gallery, Kitchener, Ont.
 1975: Tom Thomson Memorial Gallery, Owen Sound, Ont.
 1971: Robert McLaughlin Gallery, Oshawa, Ont.
 1960: Stable Gallery, Montreal (Cahen and Ronald absent)
 1959: National Gallery of Canada, touring, 7 venues (Ronald absent)
 1958: École des Beaux-Arts de Montréal 
 1957: Park Gallery, Toronto
 1956: Riverside Museum, New York (with the American Abstract Artists)
 1955: Roberts Gallery, Toronto
 1954: Roberts Gallery, Toronto

Works

See also
Canadian Group of Painters
Eastern Group of Painters
Group of Seven
Indian Group of Seven
Les Automatistes
List of Canadian Artists
Regina Five
 The Robert McLaughlin Gallery

References

Bibliography
Robert Belton, The Theatre of the Self: The Life and Art of William Ronald (Calgary: University of Calgary Press, 1999).
Graham Broad, "Painters Eleven: the Shock of the New" in The Beaver, February–March 2003, 20-26.
Grove, Jaleen. Oscar Cahén: Life & Work. Toronto: Art Canada Institute, 2015. 
Hatch, John G. Kazuo Nakamura: Life & Work. Toronto: Art Canada Institute, 2021. 
Denise Leclerc, The Crisis of Abstraction in Canada (Ottawa: National Gallery of Canada, 1992).

Iris Nowell,  Painters Eleven: The Wild Ones of Canadian Art  (Douglas & McIntyre) Sept. 2010
Dennis Reid, A Concise History of Canadian Painting (Toronto: Oxford University Press, 1973).

External links
Robert McLaughlin Gallery
 Painters Eleven

Canadian artist groups and collectives
Abstract expressionist artists
Modern painters